"Kickin' Ass" is a song by industrial rock group KMFDM from their 1986 album What Do You Know, Deutschland?. All songs on the single are also on the 1991 and 2006 releases of the album. All tracks were recorded at Zitty Zound in Hamburg, Germany.

In 2008, KMFDM Records re-released this as a 7" vinyl single, limited to 250 copies.  In 2010, the band released another version of the 7" release, also limited to 250 copies, which was sold with a bag that could hold all the 7" records from the complete 24/7 series of singles. This release featured a different colour scheme for the cover, and was pressed on red vinyl.

Track listing

1987 release

7" reissue

References

KMFDM songs
1987 debut singles
1987 songs
Songs written by Sascha Konietzko
Songs written by Pig (musical project)